The Walpurgis Hall  is a hall on the Witches' Dance Floor near Thale in the Harz mountains, Germany, built in the Old Germanic style by Hermann Hendrich and Bernhard Sehring. The hall was opened in 1901 and is a museum today. Whilst Sehring designed the architecture of the building to Hendrich's guidelines, Hendrich himself was responsible for the five large paintings in the interior of the hall. These portray scenes of the Walpurgis Night from Goethe's Faust known as the: Will-o'-the-Wisp Dance, Mammon's Cave, Witches' Dance, Bride of the Wind und Gretchen's Appearance (Gretchen's Tragedy).

Paintings

External links 
 Walpurgishalle. Painting by Hermann Hendrich
Page about the Walpurgishalle of the Nibelungen-Hortes

Buildings and structures in the Harz
Museums in Saxony-Anhalt
Cultural infrastructure completed in 1901
Walpurgis Night
Goethe's Faust